This was the first edition of the tournament, so no defending champions were declared.

Yuliya Beygelzimer and Mervana Jugić-Salkić won the title, defeating Gabriela Navrátilová and Michaela Paštiková 6–2, 6–0 in the final. It was the 2nd doubles title for Beygelzimer and the 2nd and final doubles title for Jugić-Salkić, in their respective careers.

Seeds

Draw

External links
 Main and Qualifying Draws

Internazionali di Modena